Louisville is an unincorporated community in Adams County, in the U.S. state of Ohio.

History
Louisville was laid out in 1838. The community Louisville once had was called Gustin. The Gustin post office was established in 1850, and remained in operation until 1865.

References

Unincorporated communities in Adams County, Ohio
1838 establishments in Ohio
Populated places established in 1838
Unincorporated communities in Ohio